Jacob Miller (4 May 1952 – 23 March 1980) was a Jamaican reggae artist and Rastafari from Mandeville, Jamaica. His first recording session was with the famous Clement "Sir Coxsone" Dodd in the late 1960s. While pursuing a solo career, he became the lead singer for Inner Circle, a famous roots reggae band. Miller recorded and toured with Inner Circle until he died in a tragic car crash at age 27.

Biography

Early life 
Born in Mandeville, Jamaica, in 1952, he was the only son of Joan Ashman, a choir singer and pianist. He never knew his father, Desmond Elliot. As a child, he was mainly raised by his great aunt. His mother recounts him having an especially friendly personality. One day in Half Way Tree, he threw all his money in the air to give away to friends. According to his mother, he had a strong inclination toward music—often playing rhythms with his hands or drumsticks on pots, pans, and various items. In 1960, at the age of eight, he moved to Kingston, Jamaica.

First recordings 
The move to Kingston would prove to be a seminal event in his life. Although still very young, Miller began spending much of his spare time hanging around the city's recording studios, most notably Clement "Sir Coxsone" Dodd's now-famous Studio One. He was hoping to become the studio's next big child star. 

At just thirteen years old, he recorded three songs at Studio One for Dodd, but most notably "Love is a Message". The two brothers and owners of the Rockers Sound System, Horace and Garth Swaby, played the song often around the time of its release (Horace would later become famous under the stage name Augustus Pablo). Unfortunately for Miller, the song did not garner any real success, nor did it get much attention from Dodd, however it resulted in Horace Swaby befriending Miller and sparking an interest in him as a musician with potential.

Musical career 
After the Swaby brothers launched their own label in 1972, Horace—who'd taken the stage name Augustus Pablo—recorded a version of "Love is a Message" called "Keep on Knocking" in 1974. In the next year and a half, Miller recorded five more songs for Pablo, "Baby I Love You So", "False Rasta", "Who Say Jah No Dread", "Each One Teach One", and "Girl Named Pat", each of which became a Rockers classic with King Tubby dubs on their b-sides. These singles developed Miller's reputation as a great singer, and their success ultimately drew Inner Circle to hire him as a replacement lead singer.

Inner Circle was an emerging reggae group made popular playing covers of American Top 40 hits. Band leader Roger Lewis said Jacob Miller was "always happy and jovial. He always made jokes. Everyone liked jokes." Adding Miller as lead singer, the band's lineup was Roger Lewis on guitar, Ian Lewis on bass, Bernard "Touter" Harvey on keyboards, and Rasheed McKenzie on drums. Coining Miller as Jacob "Killer" Miller, the group continued to build popularity. In 1976, Inner Circle signed with Capitol Records and released two albums, Reggae Thing and Ready for the World. Their first hit with Jacob Miller was "Tenement Yard", followed by "Tired Fi Lick Weed In a Bush".

While recording, Miller continued pursuing a solo career, recording "Forward Jah Jah Children," "Girl Don't Come" produced by Gussie Clarke, and "I'm a Natty" produced by Joe Gibbs. He earned second place in Jamaica's 1976 Festival Song competition with the song "All Night 'Till Daylight" and produced his first solo album in 1978, Dread Dread. While most of Miller's solo work were backed by Inner Circle members, his preferred rockers style diverged from the tendency of Inner Circle to experiment with other genres, including pop, soul, funk and disco. The track which has brought him the most lasting recognition is the dub reggae hit "King Tubby Meets The Rockers Uptown" with Augustus Pablo, a dub of "Baby I Love You So," engineered by King Tubby. Decades later in 2004, the popular Grand Theft Auto video game franchise would use the song in the game Grand Theft Auto: San Andreas on their in-game reggae radio station K-Jah West. 

Other notable tracks featuring Miller's vocals with Augustus Pablo's music and/or dubs include "Keep on Knocking", "False Rasta", and "Who Say Jah No Dread". The album Who Say Jah No Dread features two versions of each of these tracks; the original and a dub engineered by King Tubby.

Acting 
Miller made an eponymous cameo appearance in the cult classic roots reggae film Rockers, alongside several roots reggae musicians including Gregory Isaacs and Burning Spear. In Rockers, Miller plays a singer for a hotel's house band—which is in fact Inner Circle—who are joined on drums by the film's eponymous hero, Leroy "Horsemouth" Wallace (himself a musician). The band plays a shortened, live version of Inner Circle's hit "Tenement Yard" during a scene. Although his part in the movie is small, it is one of the few videos of Miller in existence. The film depicts Miller as he was in real life—a fun-loving, food-loving, eccentric reggae singer.

One Love Peace Concert and Heartland Reggae 
In what were possibly his greatest performances of all time, Miller appeared at the One Love Peace Concert. The "Peace Concert" took place at the National Stadium in Kingston, Jamaica on 22 April 1978, along with many of the most popular Reggae acts of the day, including Bob Marley, Peter Tosh, Bunny Wailer, U-Roy, Judy Mowatt, Dennis Brown, and others. The event drew countrywide attention because two bitter political rivals—Edward Seaga and then-Prime Minister Michael Manley—were to meet onstage and shake hands in front of Miller and Inner Circle wrote a song for the concert titled "Peace Treaty", which was a reggae interpretation of the popular folk tune "When Johnny Comes Marching Home".  

Jacob Miller and Inner Circle sets are featured prominently in the concert documentary film Heartland Reggae, which showcases the musical performances at the "One Love Peace Concert", and chronicles the historical event of the aforementioned two political rivals shaking hands onstage. Miller played two separate sets at the concert—one at night on the main stage opening for Bob Marley and the Wailers, and during the daytime the following day on a small stage in an open field nearby the National Stadium. In both sets, Miller and Inner Circle played their new "Peace Treaty" song. During the outdoor set, as highlighted in the film Heartland Reggae, Miller brazenly donned a policeman's hat and lit an enormous spliff (until 2015 cannabis was strictly illegal in Jamaica), followed by a cheers of delight from the audience.

Later life and death 
In March 1980, Jacob Miller went with Bob Marley and Island Records founder Chris Blackwell to Brazil, to celebrate Island opening new offices in South America. Not long after returning to Jamaica Sunday, 23 March 1980, Miller and one of his sons died in a car accident on Hope Road in Kingston, Jamaica. Miller and Inner Circle had been preparing for an American tour with Bob Marley and the Wailers, and the next album, Mixed Up Moods, had been recorded before his death.The papers praised Miller in the announcement of his death, saying, "He took the world by storm and would be missed for his playfulness, gaiety and laughter." Additionally, Archbishop Yeshaq of the Ethiopian Orthodox Church who hosted his funeral service said that "Miller had a desire to help those in the ghetto [...] and made a plea for man to stop destroying his own brothers and sisters."

Jacob Miller was the cousin of British reggae artist Maxi Priest. Every year his Christmas Album goes on heavy rotation during the holiday season in Jamaica, and is enjoyed amongst Jamaicans abroad as well.

References

External links
 About Jacob Miller at innercircle-reggae.com (archived version)
 
 Pandora.com (Link visitable only from the U.S., Australia and New Zealand)
 
 Roots-archive.com

Jamaican reggae musicians
Converts to the Rastafari movement
Road incident deaths in Jamaica
1952 births
1980 deaths
People from Mandeville, Jamaica
Greensleeves Records artists